"Like Me" is the official debut single by the American girl group Girlicious. It was released to iTunes on April 22, 2008 in the US and in Canada. After Tiffanie Anderson's departure, Chrystina Sayers performed her part of the bridge and melismatic vocals.

Release
On iTunes, "Like Me" was released on April 22, 2008 one day prior to The CW's airing of the finale, allowing many fans to find out who won before the finale aired. A 1:30 preview of the song was released on their official website on April 22, 2008. On September 19, 2008 the single was sent to radio in India.

Chart performance
Without being sent to radio or a physical release, the single managed to debut at number two on the US Bubbling Under Hot 100 Singles and number seventy on the Pop 100 solely based on digital sales. In addition, during the week of May 1, 2008, "Like Me" made a "Hot Shot Debut" at number four on the Canadian Hot 100 becoming an instant hit in Canada.

Music video
The music video for "Like Me" was directed by Steven Antin and premiered following the season finale alongside "Stupid Shit". The video features Girlicious in a boxing ring dancing with Jazze Pha.

In the 2009 Much Music Video Awards the video won 'Most Watched video on Much Music', with "Stupid Shit" coming in second place.

Remix
The official remix features rapper Jody Breeze.

Chart positions

Weekly charts

Year-end charts

Release history

Awards and nominations

|-
|2009
| "Like Me"
| Most Watched Video On Muchmusic.com
|
|-

References

External links
Like Me Music Video

2008 debut singles
2008 songs
Girlicious songs
Songs written by Jazze Pha
Songs written by Ester Dean
Geffen Records singles
American dance-pop songs